The BTarena is a multi-purpose indoor arena that is located in Cluj-Napoca, Romania. The arena was previously called the Polyvalent Hall but was renamed on 17 October 2017 when the facility entered into a new arena-naming rights agreement with Banca Transilvania. The venue holds 10,000 people in its largest configuration. The building is located next to the Cluj Arena.

History 

The arena opened on 21 October 2014. The arena hosted a concert, on 31 October 2014, by English musician James Blunt, who sang from his album Moon Landing. The concert had an attendance of upwards of 6,000. 

It hosted the Counter-Strike: Global Offensive Major DreamHack Open Cluj-Napoca 2015.

The arena's seating capacity for basketball games was expanded to 10,000 seats for the EuroBasket 2017. The renovation work on the arena's existing stands began after the 2017 European Artistic Gymnastics Championships. It will be used again as one of the two venues for the 2020 FIBA Under-17 Women's Basketball World Cup.

See also
List of indoor arenas in Romania
List of indoor arenas by capacity

References

External links

Official website  
Photos of the arena at Dico și Țigănaș website

Basketball venues in Romania
Buildings and structures in Cluj-Napoca
Handball venues in Romania
Indoor arenas in Romania
Music venues in Romania
Sports venues completed in 2014
Sports venues in Cluj-Napoca